Pop TV is a Slovenian generalist television channel operated by Pro Plus d.o.o., a subsidiary of Central European Media Enterprises (CME), which is in turn owned by Czech investment company PPF.

News programs

POP TV's current news programming consists of the main 24UR ("24Hours") News, 24UR popoldne ("24Hours Afternoon"), 24UR zvečer ("24Hours at Night"), 24UR Vreme ("24Hours Weather") and Preverjeno! ("Confirmed!").

Within 24UR, the following segments are currently airing: "POP IN", "Vizita" ("Medical visit"), "24UR Inšpektor" ("24Hours Inspector") and "24UR Fokus" ("24Hours Focus").

24UR

The current hosts of the show are two hosting pairs: Darja Zgonc & Edi Pucer, and Jani Muhič & Petra Krčmar. Weekdays the show is hosted by one pair and the pairs exchange each week. Weekend shows are hosted by individual hosts from each pair.

The show is criticized as having a left-wing bias. It is often accused by the Slovenian right-wing party SDS to not report about the Slovenian "underground" political corruption that SDS believes to come from many former members of the Slovenian Communist Party that ruled during the era of socialism in Slovenia and according to this conspiracy theory still has a huge influence on Slovenian state-owned companies and left-wing political parties.

24URs milestones

POP TV has been airing its main news program, 24UR, since it commenced its official broadcasts on 15 December 1995. In the beginning, the show aired from 7:30pm to 8pm, and was hosted by Drago Balažič (sports news by Franci Petek, weather forecast by Miran Trontelj).

From April 1996, Darja Zgonc and Boštjan Lajovic took over the hosting of the show as the first hosting couple. The pair hosted the show between Monday and Thursday. From Friday to Sunday, the show was hosted by Tamara Vonta and Drago Balažič, individually.

In 1997, the show introduced a second hosting pair: Nataša Pirc Musar and Sandi Salkič.

In 1998, the show was redesigned and began 15 minutes earlier, at 7:15pm.

In September 1999, the show had a 47% audience share, and with it, overcame the main news on TV SLO 1 - the first channel of the public service broadcaster RTV SLO, TV Dnevnik. From that day, 24UR became the most watched news programme in Slovenia. It still holds this title until this day.

Matjaž Tanko, a Slovenian hosting legend, along with Tamara Vonta came as a new hosting pair in January 2001.

From 2003, the show lasts for one full hour, from 7 to 8pm.

On POP TV's 13th birthday (15 December 2008), the studio and the show's design were updated to the most modern technology available at that time. The show started to air in HD quality and 16:9 aspect ratio.

Segments on 24UR

POP IN is a segment focusing on news from the world of entertainment and popular culture. It airs from Monday to Friday and is around five minutes long. On Sundays, the segment is 10–15 minutes long. It was introduced in 1996.

Vizita is a medical segment which is running from 1995. It is a five minute long documentary/info segment about health and medicine. It is aired every Friday.

TV Klub ("TV Club") was a debate segment. It aired every Sunday from 2003 onwards and lasted from 10 to 15 minutes. The hosts were Špela Šipek and other 24UR news show hosts. It was replaced by 24UR Fokus in the beginning of 2016.
 
24UR Inšpektor is a segment, hosted by the same host as the main news show 24UR that day, and lasts from 5 to 10 minutes. It airs weekly every Saturday. It is a segment focusing on investigative journalism. It was introduced in the summer of 2015.

24UR Fokus is a segment focusing on investigative journalism, which replaced TV Klub in the beginning of 2016. The host of the show is the same as the host of 24UR that day. It airs weekly every Sunday and lasts from 10 to 12 minutes.

24UR popoldne  was introduced in 2008. It is a 15–20 minute long afternoon news show which airs between 4:45pm and 5:15pm on weekdays.

24UR zvečer was introduced in 2007. It is a 15–20 minute long evening news show which airs between 10pm and 11pm on weekdays. Currently, the show is hosted by Uroš Slak from Monday to Thursday.

24UR vreme is a weather broadcast lasting for five minutes before the main 24UR news show at 6:55pm every day. It premiered in 2008.

Every Tuesday, viewers are offered the weekly investigative news show Preverjeno!, which premiered in the autumn of 2001. The show is hosted by Alenka Arko.

The channel also aired a weekly news debate show called Trenja ("Frictions") which ran from the autumn of 2002 to the spring of 2009. The show had guests (usually politicians or political commentators) debating over various topics, ranging from politics to popular culture and taboo topics. The show, which aired every Thursday, was hosted by one of the best known Slovenian journalists and TV hosts, Uroš Slak. After the show was cancelled, Uroš went on to host the daily news show Svet which airs on POP TV's sister channel Kanal A.

24UR ob enih ("24Hours at 1pm") is a one-hour-long show which aired from Monday to Friday at 1pm. The hosts were the same as the hosts of the main 24UR show. It began airing in the summer of 2010 and was cancelled in 2013 due to financial reasons.

Epilog ("Epilogue"), similar to Trenja, aired between the spring of 2014 and the autumn of 2015. It was hosted by Maja Sodja.

POP TV also hosts 3-4 pre-election debates every Slovenian election year for parliamentary, presidential and local elections. The hosts of the debates are usually the hosts of the main news show.

Entertainment programs

1995–1999

When POP TV commenced its official broadcasts, it instantly became a go-to channel for entertainment in Slovenia. In the early years, they aired a quiz show called POP Kviz (1996), music show Med prijatelji (1995), and daily breakfast show Dobro jutro, Slovenija (1996) from studios in Ljubljana and Maribor. The channel also broadcast Viktorji (1997-2010), an annual Slovenian awards show for media achievements and accomplishments in popular culture, along with the beauty peagent competition ceremony Miss Slovenija (1996-2010) for Miss World.

In the following years, the channel introduced music shows POP party (1997) and Super POP (1998), shows Pop'N'Roll (1999) and Pod srečno zvezdo (1999), and game show 1, 2, 3, kdo dobi? (1999-2001). Brez zavor / Brez zapor (1997-1998) was a new weekly music talk show in the style of Late Show With David Letterman that premiered in 1997. In 1999, POP TV began to air their first own-produced sitcom, TV dober dan (1999-2002), which was an instant hit, and lasted for six full seasons.

2000–2006

In the beginning of the 21st century, POP TV launched the Slovenian version of Who Wants To Be a Millionaire, called Lepo je biti milijonar (hosted by Jonas Žnidaršič and later Boštjan Romih) (2000-2005), which lasted for eleven seasons. The sports show for students ŠKL was also introduced.

In the next few years, a new Slovenian drama series Pod eno streho (2002-2004) and a hidden camera show Pazi, kamera! (2003-2004) were introduced. A new locally produced sitcom Trafika (2003) also premiered only one season.

In 2004, POP TV introduced their first reality show. Sanjski moški (2004) was the Slovenian version of The Bachelor, and lasted for one season. In the same year, Naša mala klinika (2004-2007), a new Slovenian sitcom, was introduced and lasted for seven full seasons. The sitcom was watched on average by 300.000 people against 2 million people, which is the population of Slovenia. In the next year, two new reality shows were introduced: Sanjska ženska (2005-2006), a local version of The Bachelorette which lasted for two seasons, and a Slovenian version of reality show The Bar, called Bar (2005-2006), which lasted also for two seasons. A hidden-camera show called Oprostite, prosim!, Vzemi ali pusti (2005-2008), local version of Deal or No Deal and music show Raketa pod kozolcem (2005-2006), also premiered in 2005. POP TV also co-produced a new crime series named Balkan Inc. (2006), with Nova TV and TV Pink.

2007–2011

In 2007, the channel aired the first season of the Slovenian adaptation of the reality show The Farm, Kmetija (2007-2008, 2011, 2017). Three seasons of the show aired, before it was announced again for autumn of 2017, after it aired on POP TV's rival Planet TV between 2014 and 2016, for three seasons. One celebrity season of the show aired, called Kmetija Slavnih (2009). The same year, a show loosely based on the popular American show Saturday Night Live, premiered. Five seasons of A's ti tud not padu?! (2007-2009) were shown. Desetka (2008) was a cooking show introduced in 2008, along with a new Slovenian sitcom called Lepo je biti sosed (2008-2011), which lasted for six seasons.

POP TV brought the popular "Got Talent" series to Slovenia in 2010. The Slovenian version was named Slovenija ima talent (2010-2011, 2013-2016), and broke all viewership records. The finale of the first season was the top-watched show of the last ten years in Slovenia. The show aired for six seasons, until the autumn of 2016, when the last season was on program. In 2010, the channel also launched the celebrity version of Slovenian adaption of Big Brother, called Big Brother Slavnih. Cooking show Ljubezen skozi želodec (2009-2011), Slovenian sitcom Trdoglavci (2011), and Slovenian version of Minute to Win it called Minuta do zmage (2011-2012), were new shows that aired.

2012–2015

In the autumn of 2012, POP TV aired the first and only season of the Slovenian version of the popular singing competition show X Factor, X Faktor Slovenija (2012). In the same year, the new original reality cooking show Gostilna išče šefa (2012-2015) started. Four seasons of the show aired. Two new Slovenian series aired: Čista desetka (2012), a new Slovenian sitcom that aired for two seasons, and Na terapiji (2012), a drama series that had actually premiered on POP TV's new sister channel, POP BRIO, a year before. Another new traveling show called Okrog sveta do srca (2012) was introduced in the same year.

The next year started with Vid in Pero šov (2013-2014), a new comedy show, along with dog training show Pozor, priden pes! (2013-2014). Both lasted for three seasons. In autumn, a second comedy show premiered, called Je bella cesta (2013-2014), which lasted for two seasons. Between 2013 and 2015, POP TV introduced a handful of cooking shows that lasted for between one and three seasons. Those were Zabeljeno po ameriško (2013), Ana kuha (2013-2014), Okusi brez meja (2013-2014), Skriti šef (2014), Gorazdova slaščičarna (2014), Zdravo, Tereza! (2015) and Polona ga žge (2015–present).

In the beginning of 2014, the channel aired a new Slovenian sitcom Mamin dan (2014), which lasted for one season. The Slovenian version of Your Face Sounds Familiar called Znan obraz ima svoj glas (2014–present), also premiered and is currently in its fourth season. TOP 4 s Tjašo Kokalj (2014-2015), a beauty/business reality show, moved from Kanal A to POP TV, and aired for two more seasons. Vrtičkanje, a gardening show, also premiered, and aired its fourth season in 2017.

In the spring of 2015, POP TV introduced two new reality shows: Popolna poroka (2015), a wedding reality show, which lasted for one season, and the Slovenian version of MasterChef series, called MasterChef Slovenija (2015–present), which will air its fourth season in the spring of 2018. It also aired a new wish fulfilling show, Dan najlepših sanj (2015–present), which was in its fourth season as of September 2017. Usodno vino was POP TV's first daily soap opera, was introduced in the autumn of 2015, and aired its fourth and final season in the spring of 2017. The channel also aired the first season of Na žaru: Z Ladom Bizovičarjem (2015-2016), which was later renewed for its second season, in the summer of 2017. The show is based on the popular comedy Roast. The third episode of this show, where popular Slovenian comedians and TV personalities roasted the current president of Republic of Slovenia - Borut Pahor, was the second best watched show in the last fifteen years on Slovenian television channels.

2016

POP TV began the year with the richest home production season in the channel's history. New seasons of previously aired shows were announced, along with five new self-produced shows. In the middle of February, the second season of the daily soap opera Usodno vino premiered, and a new family cooking competition show began its run - Moja mama kuha bolje!. Dan najlepših sanj returned to its channel in the end of February for second season. New seasons of Polona ga žge and Vrtičkanje started airing again. The third season of the beloved music competition show Znan obraz ima svoj glas began on March 6. The new locally produced sitcom Takle mamo was introduced, but was moved to the autumn of 2016 after only four episodes aired. In the middle of March, the second season of MasterChef Slovenija began airing. This season had eight celebrity and eight regular contestants. On Friday of the same week, a new reality show was introduced - Bitka parkov. Two new shows, Delovna akcija and Hipnoza: Dobra zabava are yet to be introduced to the program.

Announced shows

POP TV started collecting applications for the first season of the Slovenian version of the popular reality show Survivor, called Survivor Slovenija: Filipini. The show was set to begin on production during the summer, and to air in the autumn of 2016. In the second half of March, POP TV also started collecting applications for Slovenian version of Farmer Wants a Wife, called Ljubezen po domače, which is set to premiere that autumn. In April, the channel started collecting applications for a new original business reality show, Štartaj Slovenija, where people can present their new products that they made. If their product was chosen as the product with the most potential to be a hit on the market, they would be given a free promotion on all PRO PLUS channels, and a one-year selling contract with Slovenian branch of Spar retail chain. POP TV also announced that they would air the Slovenian version of Strictly Come Dancing, called Zvezde plešejo, in the autumn of 2016. In May, applications for the sixth season of Slovenian version of the "Got Talent" series - Slovenija ima talent - were opened.

Sport programs

Between 1997 and 2010, POP TV broadcast Formula One races. The commentator was Miran Ališič, who is very recognizable for his voice. In 2010, RTV SLO bought the rights for the broadcast.

In 2002, POP TV broadcast the matches of 2002 World Cup in collaboration with its sister channel Kanal A.

In March 1996, POP TV started to air a weekly sports talkshow Športna scena ("Sport Scene"). The show was hosted by Stane Kavčič, Bogdan Barovič and co-host Vesna Dolen. In February of the next year, the hosting was taken over by Gašper Bolhar and Nataša Briški. In August 1997, Bolhar left the show. Until 2003, Briški hosted the show alone for six years. In 2003, she was replaced by Miran Tišič who hosted the show for three more years, until 2006, when the show was cancelled. Among other popular athletes, the show's guests included Mika Häkkinen, 1998 and 1999 Formula 1 Champion in September 1999.

Foreign programs

Movies

POP TV airs top Hollywood blockbusters from all major film studios (20th Century Fox, Warner Bros. Pictures, Paramount Pictures, Universal Pictures, Walt Disney Pictures and Columbia Pictures) and movies of Slovenian and former Yugoslavian production.

Series

POP TV airs top series of American and European production, mainly focusing on Hollywood produced series.

House, Desperate Housewives, Dexter, Lost, Sex and the City, Dirty Sexy Money, Monk, CSI, CSI: Miami, CSI: New York, ER, Friends, Kommisar Rex, Law and Order: Special Victims Unit, Grey's Anatomy, Ally McBeal, Fringe, Ugly Betty, Burn Notice, The Mentalist, Breaking Bad, House of Cards, Downton Abbey, Castle, Bones, and The Blacklist are some hit series that have aired on the channel.

The Oprah Winfrey Show, Rachael Ray, The Jerry Springer Show, Ricki Lake and Dr. Oz Show are popular American shows that have aired on the channel.

Soap operas / telenovelas

In 1997, the channel started to air a Mexican telenovela, Esmeralda. The series was a huge hit and from then on, the weekday afternoons on the channel have been reserved for telenovelas.

The channel airs soap operas from many South American countries, Spain, Mexico, Turkey, Germany, Austria and Croatia.

Animated series and children's shows

In 2002, POP TV launched its first cartoon block called Ringa-raja on weekend mornings. The program lasted until 2010 when it was renamed to Moj-Moj. In 2013, the name of the block was changed again, to Oto čira čara. The block has that name until this day.

SpongeBob SquarePants, Ben 10, Bakugan Battle Brawlers, Bob the Builder, Winx Club, Roary the Racing Car, Power Rangers, Star Wars: The Clone Wars and LazyTown are some of the many cartoons and kids' shows that aired in the cartoon blocks on POP TV.

Special films 
November 15, 2021 they are Spirit Untamed and Peter Rabbit 2

Current programming (July 2022)

Nationally created shows

Nationally created series

Internationally created series

Internationally created shows

There are no internationally created shows currently being broadcast on POP TV.

Internationally created telenovelas / soap operas

Internationally created animated series

Primetime schedule (week of 8–14 April 2019)

Upcoming shows (January 2019)

Nationally created shows

 Animated 

Past programming (July 2022)

Nationally created shows

Reality shows

Game shows

News / documentary shows

Comedy shows

Cooking shows

Special events

Other shows

Series

Canceled nationally created showsZamenjajmo ženi (Slovenian version of Wife Swap)
2007Gasilci: Enota 14 (original reality documentary series about firefighters)
spring 2015Ste pametnejši od petošolca? (Slovenian version of Are You Smarter Than a 5th Grader?)
2006

Weekend morning cartoon blockRinga raja2002-2010Moj-Moj2010-2013Oto čira čara2013–present

Internationally created shows

Series3 Lbs.30 Rock7th Heaven90210 Absolute PowerAgatha Christie's Partners in CrimeAgatha Christie's PoirotAliasAlien NationAlly McBealAlways GreenerThe Amazing Mrs PritchardAngela's EyesAngieArmy WivesAs IfBaywatchBeach GirlsMr. BeanThe BeastBeautiful PeopleBetteBig ShotsBionic WomanThe Black DonnellysThe BlacklistBlessedBlue BloodsBody of ProofBonesThe Book of DanielBoston LegalBreaking BadBreakout KingsBrotherhoodBrothers & SistersBurn NoticeCalifornicationCaneCanterbury's LawCashmere MafiaCastleCarrie and BarryChaosThe ChaseChicago HopeChuckThe CleanerClose to HomeCold CaseCommander in ChiefCougar TownCrusoeCSI: NYCursedDamagesDesperate HousewivesDexterDiagnosis MurderDie KommissarinDinotopiaDirtDirty Sexy MoneyDolmenDue SouthDurham CountyEarly EditionEleventh HourEli StoneEmily's Reasons Why NotEREverwoodFairly LegalFranklin & BashFriendsFringeA Gifted ManThe GladesGoing to CaliforniaThe Golden GirlsThe Golden HourGrumpy old menGrumpy old womenHallo, Onkel Doc!Harper's IslandHeartlandHellcatsHelpHercules: The Legendary JourneysHexHome AgainHouseHotel BabylonHot in ClevelandHuman TargetHungThe Incredible Journey of Mary BryantIn JusticeInto the WestJourneymanJudging AmyJusticeKaren SiscoKeen EddieKevin HillKidnappedKingsKnight RiderL.A. DoctorsLaw & Order: Special Victims UnitLifeThe Life and Times of Vivienne VyleLife is WildLipstick JungleThe Lying GameMajor CrimesMalcolm in the MiddleMen in TreesThe MentalistMidsomer MurdersThe MommiesMonkMy Own Worst EnemyMysterious WaysThe Naked TruthNecessary Roughness North of 60NYPD BlueOcean GirlOh, Grow UpPainkiller JaneThe PalacePensacola: Wings of GoldPerson of InterestPolitical AnimalsPracticePresidio MedThe PretenderPrimevalPrison BreakPrivate PracticeProfilerProvidencePsychRainesRenegadeRennschwein Rudi RüsselRevengeThe RichesRobert Kennedy and His TimesRubiconRules of EngagementRunawaySex and the CitySex, Love & SecretsSharkShe SpiesThe Single GuyCasebook of Sherlock HolmesSide Order of LifeSleeper CellSnoopsStandoffStar StoriesThe State WithinStorm of the CenturyStrong MedicineStudio 60 on the Sunset StripStupid Stupid ManSuburban ShootoutSuitsSuperstormSurfaceSweet Valley HighSwingtownTakenTerminator: The Sarah Connor ChroniclesThat '80s ShowThe Thin Blue LineTin ManTo the Ends of the Earth TravelerThe TriangleThe TudorsUgly BettyVincentWalker Texas RangerWater RatsThe West WingWild at HeartWild CardWildfireWithout a TraceThe X-FilesAnimated series

Special programs 

 Peter Rabbit The Runaway  October 7, 2022
 Spirit Untamed  November 15, 2021

Film 

 Annie (2014) May 31, 2021
 Encanto October 7, 2022
 Free Birds'' October 8, 2022

DVB-T
Since 1 December 2010, POP TV programming has been available in the digital (DVB-T) technique. Transmission is, since 14 October 2013, a part of the national digital multiplex called multiplex C. Since 16 January 2017, POP TV has no longer been available via DVB-T.

See also

Pro Plus d.o.o.
Kanal A

References

External links

 Schedule for POP TV

Television channels and stations established in 1995
Central European Media Enterprises
Television channels in Slovenia
Mass media in Ljubljana